Japaratuba is a municipality located in the Brazilian state of Sergipe. Its population was 18,907 (2020) and its area is 360 km².

References

Municipalities in Sergipe